William Robert Berkley (born 1946) is the founder and current chairman of W. R. Berkley Corporation and the chairman of the New York University Board of Trustees.

His net worth is $4.4 billion and he is ranked 285th on the Forbes 400.

Early life and education
Berkley grew up in North Jersey, the middle child of three boys. When he was 11 years old, his father was killed in an airplane crash. He started investing in the stock market at age 12 with money he made from lawn mowing.

Berkley graduated from the New York University Stern School of Business with an undergraduate degree in 1966. He received an MBA from Harvard Business School in 1968. While at Harvard, he ran a $2 million mutual fund out of an apartment on the Harvard campus with a classmate, Paul Dean.

Career
In 1967, he founded W. R. Berkley Corporation. In November 1973, when the company became a public company via an initial public offering, he owned 23.8% of the company. In 2015, he left the CEO position to become Executive Chairman. To which his son Rob Berkley Jr. took over as CEO.

Berkley has served as chairman of board at New York University, his alma mater, since 2014.

Personal life
Berkley is married to Marjorie, who was his secretary when he founded his company. They have three children.

References

External links 
William R. Berkley Collection at Stuart A. Rose Manuscript, Archives, & Rare Book Library, Emory University 

1946 births
Living people
New York University Stern School of Business alumni
American business executives
Harvard Business School alumni
American billionaires